Fisher v. University of Texas may refer to either of two United States Supreme Court cases:

 Fisher v. University of Texas (2013) (alternatively called Fisher I), 570 U.S. 279 (2013), a case which ruled that strict scrutiny should be applied to determine the constitutionality of a race-sensitive admissions policy.
 Fisher v. University of Texas (2016) (alternatively called Fisher II), 579 U.S. 365 (2016), a case which ruled that the University of Texas's use of race in their admissions policy passes the constitutional muster.

See also
 List of United States Supreme Court cases
 Lists of United States Supreme Court cases by volume